Ambongamarina is a rural municipality in the Analamanga Region, Madagascar, 110 km north-east of the capital Antananarivo, in the district of Anjozorobe.
It has a population of 15,382 inhabitants in 2018.  It's principally inhabited by Merina and Sihanaka people.

The commune has no road access and 5 hours of hike is necessary to reach it.

Economy
The economy is based on agriculture.  Rice, corn, peanuts, beans, manioc, soja and oignons are the main crops.
Another important crop is Tsiperifery, a wild pepper species.

References

Populated places in Analamanga